Fasoula is a surname. Notable people with the surname include:

Mariella Fasoula (born 1997), Greek basketball player, daughter of Panagiotis
Panagiotis Fasoulas (born 1963), Greek politician and basketball player

Greek-language surnames